The Dedham Public Library is a public library system established in 1872. It is part of the Minuteman Library Network.

History

Social library
In 1794, the First Church and Parish in Dedham organized a social library. The minister, Jason Haven, kept the books in his house and they were only circulated on Mondays. The books were eventually moved to the vestry of the church, and circulation was moved to Sundays.

Dedham Library Association
On the November 24, 1854, a social library was organized in Dedham under the general laws by the name of the Dedham Library Association. The impetus for the founding the Library Association was Carlos Slafter, who made the first suggestion, and Dr. Joseph P. Paine. The pair raised $1,300. A circulating library belonging to Elbridge G. Robinson, editor of the Norfolk Democrat, was purchased for about $200. In addition to these, many new books were bought at an expense of about $1,000.

Three gentlemen, Edmund Quincy, Edward L. Keyes, and M.B. Inches, became actively interested in the project and contributed much to its success. The library was opened to the public on February 1, 1855, in a house next to the insurance building where Judge Ezra Wilkinson formerly had an office. Dr. Samuel Adams, a dentist, was the first librarian and lived in the same building. By the payment of $5, a person became a shareholder and member of the Association and was obliged to pay a varying sum annually toward its support.  After a time, persons not members were admitted on payment of a fixed sum annually.  The directors were able, at a moderate cost, to furnish the patrons with the best reading matter to be secured. The interest in the library as well as the number of readers increased from year to year and its influence upon the social and intellectual improvement of the town was marked.

Incorporation as a public library
For some time previous to 1870, a strong desire had been felt by many members of the association and others interested in the usefulness of the library that free privileges should be granted to the people of the town. This was found not to be feasible owing to insufficient funds. There was such a demand for this change that an effort was made to raise money for the support of a public library. A successful fair was held by the ladies of the Association soon after this in which people of all parts of the town were actively interested and which resulted in raising $4,000 as a fund for the new library.

Several persons had petitioned the Massachusetts General Court for an act of incorporation, which was passed March 24, 1871 and accepted April 27, 1871. This act incorporated Waldo Colburn, Thomas L. Wakefield, Edward Stimson, Edmund Quincy, William Chickering, Erastus Worthington, Alfred Hewins, Henry 0. Hildreth, and their associates and successors by the name of the Dedham Public Library and Reading Room. It also gave them power to hold in trust real and personal estate in value not exceeding $100,000 exclusive of books, papers, and works of art. The act stated that so long as said corporation shall allow the inhabitants of Dedham free access to its library and reading room under reasonable regulations, the town may annually appropriate and pay said corporation a sum not exceeding one dollar on each of its ratable polls.

At a meeting of the trustees held in November, it was voted to open a free public library and reading room at the earliest practicable date. The Dedham Library Association was deeply interested in this movement and, at a special meeting held on November 17, unanimously voted to transfer the entire property of the association to the public library to remain in the care control and custody of the said Dedham Public Library so long as the same shall be kept and maintained as a free library for the use of the proprietors of this library wherever resident as well as for the inhabitants of Dedham. An additional condition was that the public library must assume and pay all the debts and liabilities of the Library Association. This gift amounted to 2,977 volumes and formed the nucleus of the new library.

First reading room
On February 24, 1872, the library and reading room were opened to the public in rooms hired for the purpose in a building on the corner of High and Court streets. There were 3,557 volumes on the shelves and some of the principal periodicals and newspapers on the tables. From year to year, the town appropriated on an average about $1,000. Of this sum, about $700 represented the dog tax. The running expenses of the library were paid from the town appropriation and books and periodicals were bought from the annual income of the funds which amounted to about $550. The average yearly increase was about 235 volumes.

First building

Soon after the death of Hannah Shuttleworth on February 22, 1886, the first steps were taken to erect a new library building. This was made possible by her legacy of $10,000 and a gift of the same amount from John Bullard. In April 1886, a lot of 19,101 square feet in size  was purchased for $2,000 on the corner of Church and Norfolk Streets; the ground was broken on October 13. Previously, the lot was home to a large white house and an orchard.

At a meeting of the trustees held September 22, it was voted to add $4,000 from the general fund to the Bullard and Shuttleworth legacies which were given specially for a building fund.  This amount was increased by the accumulation of the funds. The final cost of the building was as follows: cost of land, $4,975.14, grading and fencing, $587.44, building and furniture, $29,873.17, total, $35,385.75. 

This building was constructed of Dedham pink granite laid up with random ashlar work in quarry facings and trimmings of red sandstone. The main entrance was by a wide arch opening on a porch from which through a vestibule access is obtained to a square entrance hall. From this hall, a wide arch opens opposite the porch into the reading hall and another on the right into the delivery room.

Back of the delivery room and at the right of the reading hall from which it was divided by a glass screen partition was the librarian's room, so placed as to give the librarian control of the public area of the building. The wing of the building was constructed as a fire proof book stack, the shelving of which accommodated 28,800 volumes. The first ever use of a metal stack system was probably Van Brunt design of the Statehouse Library in Topeka, Kansas in 1883. Dedham's was designed three years later.

Between the delivery room and the book stack was a round tower which gave access to a large room directly over the porch, used by the trustees. The reading hall was an open timbered room twenty one feet high with arched trusses and an apsidal end and a frieze of high windows. Opposite the main entrance into this room was an open hooded fireplace, above which was a marble plane for an inscription. This design was typical of Van Brunt's libraries, which often had a sequence of public rooms integrating the entry, book delivery, and reading rooms. The stacks were perpendicular to the main building.

The woodwork of the interior of the building was brown ash and the plaster surfaces were treated with color and border lines. The interior of the stack was painted white. The system of heating was by indirect radiation in the main portion of the building and by direct radiation in the book stack. The building was opened to the public on November 22, 1888.

A children's room was established in 1916. When the Dedham station was demolished in 1951, the stones were used to build an addition to the library.

Work with the schools
The annual circulation of the library was about 28,000 volumes in 1899, nearly one third of which went through the delivery stations in the upper grades of the grammar schools in charge of the teachers. This effort to connect the library more intimately with the work of the Dedham Public Schools widened its service and made it a stronger factor in the education of the children. This system helped to fill a need long felt of some intelligent oversight of the reading by young people.

Through the interest of the superintendent of schools, Roderick W. Hine, the whole plan has been developed and successfully carried out. A list of books was prepared by the superintendent and a committee of the teachers and typewritten copies having the shelf numbers were placed in the various schools. A special library card was printed for the use of scholars in drawing books, the cards were sent to the library. The books were then sent to the school in a basket at little or no expense. The books were then distributed and kept in the homes during the specified time and returned to the library in the same basket. With this improvement in the circulation of books sprang up a new interest in a better selection of reading for the young.

Early gifts
Charles Bullard, from whom the first bequest came, changed the provision in his will just before his death on July 29, 1871, so that the public library should receive $3,000 in the place of $2,000 for the Library Association. Only the income of this was to be used for the purchase of books.

Among the special gifts to this collection may be mentioned the following: Henry 0. Hildreth gave several hundred volumes at different times. Ebenezer Wright gave a bequest of 170 volumes relating mostly to agriculture and horticulture. Dr. George E. Hatton made a bequest of 154 volumes and some pamphlets. In 1880, William Ames gave 416 volumes. Dr. Henry P. Quincy in 1886 gave 342 volumes. John Bullard donated an Encyclopædia Britannica. Many other important gifts were made by persons interested in the library and the whole number added to the generous donation of the Dedham Library Association to the end of 1888 amounted to about 3,000 volumes. Gifts in money were received as follows: from the ladies fair $4,000, bequest of Charles Bullard in 1871, $3,000, from Joseph W. Clark in 1872, $411, bequest of Dr. Danforth P. Wright in 1874, $1,000, bequest of Dr. George Hatton in 1876, $1,000, legacy of John Bullard of New York in 1882, $10,000. In early years the library also received the following gifts: Albert W. Nickerson, $5,000, Joseph W. Clark, $1,000, George A. Nickerson, $1,000, Stephen M. Weld, $500, Henry P. Quincy $200, A. Ward Lamson, $100, and John R. Bullard, $469.49.

Statistics

Branches
After Katherine Endicott died in 1967, she left the Endicott Estate to the Town of Dedham. Her nine car garage was converted into the Endicott branch of the library in 1972.

In 1908, the success of the reading room in East Dedham prompted the trustees to establish a full branch in the neighborhood, complete with a reference section. There was also for a time in the early 1900s a reading room in Oakdale Square. Both later closed.

Governance

On April 1, 1889, by act of the General Court, the trustees transferred the entire property of the library to the town. On the same date the town voted to accept the gift of the franchise library and property, real and personal, of the Dedham Public Library upon the condition that the town would forever maintain the same as a free public library. At that time, nine trustees were elected by ballot: three for three years, three for two years, and three for one year.

Previous to the transfer, the same system was in operation but the town had no representation on the board. The presidents of the Library Association were John Gardner one year, Edmund Quincy five years, Carlos Slafter nine years, John Cox, Jr. three years, Carlos Slafter one year during which time the gift was made to the public library in 1871.

From 1871 to 1889 the officers were Alfred Hewins, president, Henry 0. Hildreth, clerk, and Henry W. Richards, treasurer. When John R. Bullard declined reelection in April 1898, Hon. Winslow Warren was elected as chairman of the board.

In 2020, all five trustees resigned from their positions, saying they did not feel supported by the Town.

Notes

References

Works cited

History of Dedham, Massachusetts
Organizations established in 1872
Public libraries in Massachusetts
American librarianship and human rights
Libraries established in 1872
1872 establishments in Massachusetts
Buildings and structures in Dedham, Massachusetts
Libraries in Norfolk County, Massachusetts